Events from the year 1939 in France.

Incumbents
President: Albert Lebrun 
President of the Council of Ministers: Édouard Daladier

Events
27 February – United Kingdom and France recognize Franco's government in Spain.
17 June – Last public guillotining in France – murderer Eugen Weidmann.
3 September – United Kingdom, France, New Zealand and Australia declare war on Germany.

Sport
10 July – Tour de France begins.
30 July – Tour de France ends, won by Sylvère Maes of Belgium.

Births
1 February – Claude François, singer and songwriter (died 1978)
29 March – Roland Arnall, businessman and diplomat in the United States (died 2008)
3 April – François de Roubaix, film score composer (died 1975)
9 May – Pierre Desproges, humorist (died 1988)
24 June – Brigitte Fontaine, singer, writer and poet
31 July – France Nuyen, actress
9 August – Bulle Ogier, actress
30 September – Jean-Marie Lehn, chemist, shared Nobel Prize in Chemistry in 1987
10 November – Maia Simon, actress (died 2007)

Deaths
23 February – Jules-Felix Coutan, sculptor (born 1848)
29 March – Henri Bénard, physicist (born 1874)
16 September – Otto Wels, German politician (born 1873)
14 October – Polaire (Emilie Marie Bouchaud), singer and actress (born 1874)
5 November – Charles Barrois, geologist and palaeontologist (born 1851)

See also
 List of French films of 1939

References

1930s in France